Sumrall Peak is a peak in Antarctica, 1,130 m, standing 1 nautical mile (1.9 km) south of Rosser Ridge in the Cordiner Peaks, Pensacola Mountains. It was mapped by the United States Geological Survey (USGS) from surveys and U.S. Navy air photos from 1956 to 1966. It was named by the Advisory Committee on Antarctic Names (US-ACAN) for Ens. William H. Sumrall, a U.S. Navy Reserve and an airplane pilot that was part of the Ellsworth Station winter party of 1957.

Mountains of Queen Elizabeth Land
Pensacola Mountains